Bouwerie is a historic home located at Clermont in Columbia County, New York.  The house was built in 1762 and is a large, two-story patterned-brick residence with a gambrel roof and rear frame wings.  Also on the property are three interconnected barns.

It was added to the National Register of Historic Places in 1983.

References

Houses on the National Register of Historic Places in New York (state)
Georgian architecture in New York (state)
Houses completed in 1762
Houses in Columbia County, New York
National Register of Historic Places in Columbia County, New York